The Fall 2021 Detroit City FC season was the club's third professional season since the club was established in 2012. It was also the team's third and final season in the National Independent Soccer Association.

Club

Roster 
As of August 7, 2021.

Coaching staff

Transfers

In

Out

Loan out

Friendlies

Competitions

NISA Independent Cup 

Details for the 2021 NISA Independent Cup were released on June 10. Detroit was placed in the Great Lakes Region for the second straight year along with Rust Belt Derby rivals FC Buffalo, Cleveland SC, and Midwest Premier League side Livonia City FC.

City won the regional title for a second straight season after beating Cleveland, 4–1, in its third match.

Standings

Matches

National Independent Soccer Association season 

Details regarding the Fall season were released on June 16.

Standings

Results summary

Matches

Squad statistics

Appearances and goals 

|-
! colspan="14" style="background:#dcdcdc; text-align:center"| Goalkeepers

|-
! colspan="18" style="background:#dcdcdc; text-align:center"| Defenders

|-
! colspan="18" style="background:#dcdcdc; text-align:center"| Midfielders

|-
! colspan="18" style="background:#dcdcdc; text-align:center"| Forwards

|-
|}

Goal scorers

Disciplinary record

References 

Detroit City FC
Detroit City FC